The Rage of the Vulture is a 1948 novel by the Australian-British writer Alan Moorehead. It is set in a fictional princely state, modelled on Kashmir, at the time of the Partition of India in 1947. As a war correspondent, Moorehead had himself been present at the time the events depicted.

Film adaptation
The novel was adapted by the Hollywood studio Paramount Pictures into the 1951 film Thunder in the East directed by Charles Vidor and starring Alan Ladd, Deborah Kerr, Charles Boyer and Corinne Calvet.

References

Bibliography
 Goble, Alan. The Complete Index to Literary Sources in Film. Walter de Gruyter, 1999.
 McCamish, Thornton.  Our Man Elsewhere: In Search of Alan Moorehead. Black Inc.,  2017.

1948 British novels
1948 Australian novels
Australian thriller novels
British thriller novels
Novels set in India
Australian novels adapted into films
British novels adapted into films
Hamish Hamilton books